Medley or Medleys may refer to:

Sports
Medley swimming, races requiring multiple swimming styles 
Medley relay races at track meets

Music
Medley (music), multiple pieces strung together

People
Medley (surname), list of people with this name

Places
Medley, Florida, a town
Medley, West Virginia, an unincorporated community
Medley, Alberta

Other
Medley cloth or Medleys, a woollen fabric
Medley Hall
Medley Centre, shopping mall in Irondequoit, New York
Medley Footbridge, Oxford, England
Medley Sailing Club, Oxford, England